The three-finger salute is a salute used by the Sicilian nationalists and separatists.

It was especially used during the era of the Movement for the Independence of Sicily (1943–1951) led by Andrea Finocchiaro Aprile.

The salute represents the Trinacria's three legs.

References

See also 
 Trinacria
 Sicilian nationalism
 Movement for the Independence of Sicily
 Three-finger salute (Serbian)

Fingers
Hand gestures
Salutes
Sicilian nationalism